Johannes "Hans" de Vries (born 12 March 1927) is Dutch economic historian. He was historian of De Nederlandsche Bank.

De Vries was born in Heemstede. In 1959 he obtained his PhD in economic sciences at the University of Amsterdam under  with a thesis titled: "Economische achteruitgang der Republiek in de achttiende eeuw". He was elected member of the Royal Netherlands Academy of Arts and Sciences in 1979.

References

1927 births
Possibly living people
20th-century Dutch historians
Economic historians
Members of the Royal Netherlands Academy of Arts and Sciences
People from Heemstede
University of Amsterdam alumni